USS Alarm—an experimental torpedo boat constructed at the New York Navy Yard—was launched on 13 November 1873 and commissioned in 1874.

Designed and constructed specifically for the experimental work of the Bureau of Ordnance, Alarm served that purpose at Washington, D.C., until 1877 when she moved north to Newport, RI, to conduct experiments at the torpedo station. She returned to Washington the following year and resumed special service. In 1880, she began a tour of experimental work at New York which she carried out until she was laid up at Norfolk, VA, in 1883. In 1881, William Elbridge Sewell, who would later become Governor of Guam, was placed in command. However, she resumed her research duties at New York in 1884 and served there until she was placed out of commission in 1885 and berthed at New York.

The records are unclear, but Alarm probably remained out of commission from that time forward. In 1890 and 1891, she was undergoing conversion to a gunnery training ship. From 1892 to 1894, she remained at the New York Navy Yard. In 1895, she was listed as "in ordinary;" and, in 1897, her name was struck from the Navy list. She was sold on 23 February 1898.

References
 
 USS ALARM (Experimental Torpedo Boat)

1873 ships
Ships built in Brooklyn
Torpedo boats of the United States Navy